The Berkeley Township School District is a community public school district that is responsible for the education of children in pre-kindergarten through sixth grade from Berkeley Township, in Ocean County, New Jersey, United States.

As of the 2019–20 school year, the district, comprised of four schools, had an enrollment of 2,479 students and 201.5 classroom teachers (on an FTE basis), for a student–teacher ratio of 12.3:1.

The district is classified by the New Jersey Department of Education as being in District Factor Group "B", the second-lowest of eight groupings. District Factor Groups organize districts statewide to allow comparison by common socioeconomic characteristics of the local districts. From lowest socioeconomic status to highest, the categories are A, B, CD, DE, FG, GH, I and J.

Students in public school for seventh through twelfth grades attend the schools of the Central Regional School District, which serves students from the municipalities of Berkeley Township, Island Heights, Ocean Gate, Seaside Heights and Seaside Park. Schools in the district (with 2019–20 enrollment data from the National Center for Education Statistics) are 
Central Regional Middle School with 842 students in grades 7 and 8 and 
Central Regional High School with 1,568 students in grades 9 - 12. The high school district's board of education is comprised of nine members, who are directly elected by the residents of the constituent municipalities to three-year terms of office on a staggered basis, with three seats up for election each year. Seats on the high school district's board of education are allocated based on the population of the constituent municipalities, with Berkeley Township allocated five of the board's nine seats.

Schools
Schools in the district (with 2019–20 enrollment data from the National Center for Education Statistics) are:
Elementary schools
Bayville Elementary School with 499 students in grades PreK-4
Steven Rieder, Principal
H. & M. Potter Elementary School with 629 students in grades PreK-4
Andrea Cimino, Principal
Clara B. Worth Elementary School with 663 students in grades PreK-4
Cara Burton, Principal
Middle school
Berkeley Township Elementary School with 574 students in grades 5-6
Daniel Prima, Principal

Administration
Core members of the district's administration are:
Dr. James D. Roselli Superintendent
Tyler A Verga, Business Administrator / Board Secretary

Board of education
The district's board of education, comprised of eleven members, sets policy and oversees the fiscal and educational operation of the district through its administration. As a Type II school district, the board's trustees are elected directly by voters to serve three-year terms of office on a staggered basis, with either three or four seats up for election each year held (since 2012) as part of the November general election. The board appoints a superintendent to oversee the day-to-day operation of the district.

References

External links
Berkeley Township School District

School Data for the Berkeley Township Elementary Schools, National Center for Education Statistics
Central Regional School District

Berkeley Township, New Jersey
New Jersey District Factor Group B
School districts in Ocean County, New Jersey